Puzzle & Dragons X is a Japanese anime series based on the mobile game of the same name. It premiered on July 4, 2016. The opening theme is "WE ARE GO" by UVERworld, while the ending theme is "ColorFULLCombo!" (カラーFULLコンボ！) by Shiori Tomita. From episode 27 to 51, the second opening theme is "Colors" by Lenny code fiction, while the ending theme is "Puzzle" by Natsume Mito, but it debuted in episode 30. From episodes 52 to 89, the third opening is "Montage" by Porno Graffitti, while the ending theme is "Colorful Jump" by J*Dee'Z.

Episode list

Notes

References

Puzzle and Dragons X
Puzzle & Dragons